Grandma Tracy is a fictional character in the puppet television series Thunderbirds and its animated remake Thunderbirds Are Go. She is the mother of Jeff Tracy and the paternal grandmother of the Tracy brothers: Scott, John, Virgil, Gordon and Alan. The character was voiced by Christine Finn in the original series and Sandra Dickinson in the remake.

Depiction in Thunderbirds
Little is known about Grandma Tracy's past, and her real name is never mentioned on screen with all the characters, sometimes even her son Jeff, calling her "Grandma". As a young girl, her grandmother took her round London and she travelled on the London Underground, a fact that would prove useful later for International Rescue ("Vault of Death"). She was married to a Kansas wheat farmer but was widowed some time before International Rescue began and helped Jeff bring up his five sons after the untimely death of his wife. During International Rescue's early days she lived alone near San Miguel, somewhere in the Western United States. However, she began to miss feeling useful, so decided to move to Tracy Island.

Shortly after winning the Parola Sands Race, her youngest grandson Alan Tracy picks her up so she can move to Tracy Island. Unfortunately, a racing competitor of Alan's takes revenge and Alan and Grandma find themselves having to sit still on a bridge spanning the San Miguel River due to a bomb that the enemy has placed under it – should either of them move, the bomb will detonate and the bridge will be destroyed. They are rescued by Alan's brothers, allowing Grandma to see her family's work first hand ("Moveand You're Dead"). She then moves into the Tracy household.

As the Tracy matriarch, Grandma keeps her family together, offering wisdom and advice for them and the others in the household, like Alan's love Tin-Tin Kyrano. It is Grandma who keeps Alan and Tin-Tin together when one of Tin-Tin's old flames pays a visit ("End of the Road"). Along with Kyrano and Tin-Tin, Grandma takes care of domestic chores in the Tracy household, though she can sometimes be confused by all the technological gadgetry – at one point getting tracking bugs mixed into her apple pie ("Day of Disaster") but later being able to work a nuclear oven ("Give or Take a Million").

Although not an active part of International Rescue, Grandma still plays a role when needed. She has been known to help her grandsons put together equipment they need ("Sun Probe") and it is she who comes up with a solution for a rescue mission at the Bank of England when everyone else is stuck ("Vault of Death"). She also attends the filming of an edition of the Ned Cook Show in which the host thanks International Rescue for saving his life ("Terror in New York City"). Grandma has never visited a stately home but hopes to do so one day, especially after meeting Lady Penelope ("The Mighty Atom").

Grandma's chronology is unclear in that she does not move to Tracy Island until "Moveand You're Dead" (production number 9), despite being mentioned in "Sun Probe" (production number 4) and appearing in all four episodes filmed in between. In the original broadcast order, Grandma appears in even more episodes prior to "Moveand You're Dead". While the character was intended to debut in that episode and originally did not appear in any of the previous eight, she was added in when the runtime for each episode was unexpectedly doubled from 25 to 50 minutes by order of Lew Grade, owner of the series' production company AP Films, forcing the writers to devise extra scenes and subplots to pad out the 25-minute episodes that had already been filmed.

The puppet character was sculpted by either John Blundall or Carolyn Turner.

Appearances

"The Uninvited"
"The Mighty Atom"
"Vault of Death"
"Operation Crash-Dive"
"Moveand You're Dead"
"Terror in New York City"
"End of the Road"
"Day of Disaster"
"Desperate Intruder"
"The Man from MI.5"
"Cry Wolf"
"The Duchess Assignment"
"Attack of the Alligators!"
"The Cham-Cham"
"Lord Parker's 'Oliday"
"Ricochet"
"Give or Take a Million"

Other appearances
Grandma briefly appears in the film Thunderbird 6 but has no dialogue. The character is absent from the 2004 live-action film, in which she is replaced by a new character called Onaha, who is shown to be Kyrano's wife and Tin-Tin's mother.

Grandma returns in the 2015 remake series Thunderbirds Are Go, for which she is voiced by Sandra Dickinson. In the remake, she is one of only three people who know of Kayo's relation with The Hood (the others being Jeff and Kayo). She has a noticeably different personality: she is tougher than the original puppet character, has taken over the role of head of the family following Jeff's disappearance, and is a very poor cook. In series 2, her first name is revealed to be Sally. Carolyn Percy of the Wales Arts Review comments that the remake character's "loving but no-nonsense" personality is in contrast with the original puppet character, who was played as more of a "stereotypical sweet little old lady".

References

External links
 Fab1.co.nz - Thunderbirds Characters

American female characters in television
Female characters in animated series
Fictional characters from Kansas
Television characters introduced in 1965
Thunderbirds (TV series) characters